Charles Epperson (June 16, 1919 – December 16, 1996) was an American basketball player.  He was an early professional player in the National Basketball League (which later merged with the Basketball Association of America to form the NBA) and was a starter on the University of Wisconsin's 1941 national championship team.

Epperson, a 6'1" forward from Jackson, Michigan, played college basketball at Wisconsin for future Hall of Fame coach Bud Foster.  Epperson played from 1939 to 1942 and, as a junior, was a starting forward for the Badgers' 1941 national championship team.

After the completion of his college career, Epperson played in the National Basketball League for the Sheboygan Red Skins in 1942 and 1946.  He also played a season in the short-lived Professional Basketball League of America for the Saint Joseph Outlaws in 1947–48.

References

External links
NBA stats
NBL stats
Charlie Epperson's profile at Pro Basketball Encyclopedia

1919 births
1996 deaths
Basketball players from Michigan
Forwards (basketball)
Sportspeople from Jackson, Michigan
Professional Basketball League of America players
Sheboygan Red Skins players
Wisconsin Badgers men's basketball players
American men's basketball players